The Galician Campaign of 1384 was a Portuguese naval campaign commanded by a Castillian noble, Don Pedro de Trastámara, who sided with John I of Portugal. The Portuguese, whose main ship was the Royal galley itself, made a series of attacks on Galicia, conquering the towns of Baiona, A Coruña and Neda and burning the coastal town of Ferrol to the ground. Additionally, the Portuguese destroyed approximately 2 large Castilian ships and captured a galley. All three ships were carrying supplies to the Castilian army besieging Lisbon.

When the Portuguese returned to Porto celebrations were held to honour their victory.

See also
History of Portugal
Kingdom of Portugal
Treaty of Windsor (1386)
João das Regras
Hundred Years War

Notes

References
Maria Helena da Cruz Coelho, Reis de Portugal - D. João I, Círculo de Leitores, Lisboa, 2005, Vol. X, pp 48

1384 in Europe
Tejo 1384
Tejo 1384
Conflicts in 1384
Battles of the 1383–1385 Portuguese interregnum